The Lady and the Unicorn is the 1970 solo album by British folk musician John Renbourn. On this release, Renbourn ventures into folk rock and medieval music territory. The first four tracks are arranged from the Add MS 29987 manuscript. The cover was taken from The Lady and the Unicorn tapestry.

Track listing
1.1."Trotto"  (Anonymous) – 0:40
1.2."Saltarrello"  (Anonymous) – 1:53
2.1."Lamento Di Tristan"  (Anonymous) – 1:58
2.2."La Rotta"  (Anonymous) – 0:55
3.1."Veri Floris"  (Anonymous) – 0:44
3.2."Triple Ballade (Sanscuer-Amordolens-Dameparvous)"  (Guillaume de Machaut) – 2:00
4.1."Bransle Gay"  (Claude Gervaise) – 1:13
4.2."Bransle De Bourgogne"  (Robert Johnson)– 1:34
5.1."Alman"  (Anonymous)– 1:25
5.2."Melancholy Galliard"  (John Dowland) – 2:47
6."Sarabande"  (Johann Sebastian Bach) – 2:41
7."The Lady And The Unicorn"  (John Renbourn) – 3:21
8.1."My Johnny Was A Shoemaker"  (Traditional) – 4:16
8.2."Westron Wynde"  (Traditional) – 1:25
8.3."Scarborough Fair"  (Traditional) – 7:22

Personnel
John Renbourn – guitar, sitar
Terry Cox – hand drums, glockenspiel
Lea Nicholson – concertina
Ray Warleigh – flute
Tony Roberts – flute
Don Harper – viola
Dave Swarbrick – violin

Production
Producer: Bill Leader
Liner notes: Colin Harper

References

1970 albums
John Renbourn albums
Reprise Records albums
Transatlantic Records albums
Albums produced by Bill Leader